Helen Hong Hui Bullock (born 16 May 1965) is a Chinese-born Australian politician.

Biography
Born in Nanjing, China, to Dai Bin-Hai and Gao Wen-Hua, Bullock arrived in Western Australia on 28 January 1991. She was an accountant before entering politics, holding a Bachelor of Commerce and a Postgraduate Diploma in Business. In 2008, she was elected to the Western Australian Legislative Council as a Labor Party member, representing Mining and Pastoral Region. Her term commenced on 22 May 2009.

In 1994, she married trade unionist and later Labor senator Joe Bullock.

She has been a member of Australian Services Union and Chung Wah Association Inc.

References

1965 births
Living people
Members of the Western Australian Legislative Council
Australian accountants
Australian Labor Party members of the Parliament of Western Australia
Curtin University alumni
Chinese emigrants to Australia
Politicians from Nanjing
Australian politicians of Chinese descent
21st-century Australian politicians
21st-century Australian women politicians
Women members of the Western Australian Legislative Council